Marián Tvrdoň (born 18 August 1994) is a Slovak professional footballer who plays as a goalkeeper for Czech club Viktoria Plzeň.

Club career
Tvrdoň is a youth product of the Slovak side Nitra, and had a brief loan with the youth side of ViOn Zlaté Moravce. He began his senior career in Czechia with Ústí nad Labem in 2014, and had several loans with lower-league Czech teams in his first couple of years. Returning to Ústí nad Labem, in the 2020–21 season, he was named goalkeeper of the season in the Czech National Football League. This earned him a move to the Czech First League with Viktoria Plzeň where he signed a 3-year contract. Normally acting as their backup goalkeeper, Tvrdoň was the starter for the club in a UEFA Champions League match against FC Bayern Munich on 4 October 2022.

Honours
Viktoria Plzeň
 Czech First League: 2021–22

References

External links
 
 FC Viktoria profile 
 
 Livesport profile 
 Sportnet SK Profile 

1994 births
Living people
Sportspeople from Nitra
Slovak footballers
Association football goalkeepers
Czech First League players
Czech National Football League players
Slovak expatriate footballers
Slovak expatriate sportspeople in the Czech Republic
Expatriate footballers in the Czech Republic
FK Ústí nad Labem players
FC Viktoria Plzeň players